Sir William Phené Neal, 1st Baronet (22 October 1860 – 7 July 1942), was a British businessman and 603rd Lord Mayor of London.

Neal published The Food Supply of the Nation in 1924. He served as Sheriff of London in 1929–30 and as Lord Mayor of London between 1930 and 1931. He was created a baronet, of Cherry Hinton in the County of Cambridge, in 1931. He died in July 1942, aged 81, when the baronetcy became extinct.

References

1860 births
1942 deaths
People from Cherry Hinton
Sheriffs of the City of London
20th-century lord mayors of London
20th-century English politicians
Members of London County Council
Baronets in the Baronetage of the United Kingdom